Francesco Pegoretti is an Italian make-up artist. He was nominated for an Academy Award in the category Best Makeup and Hairstyling for the film Pinocchio.

Selected filmography 
 Pinocchio (2019; co-nominated with Dalia Colli and Mark Coulier)

References

External links 

Living people
Year of birth missing (living people)
Place of birth missing (living people)
Italian make-up artists